Ahmed El Mazoury (born 15 March 1990) is an Italian born Moroccan male long-distance runner.

Biography
Ahmed El Mazoury was born in Morocco on the 15th of March, 1990. He moved to Italy at the age of 3, and lives in Brivio.

He won two national championships at senior level. He also won a silver medal at under 23 international level at the 2011European U23 Championships, finished top 8 in a competition at the highest level outside of the Olympic Games and World championships, he finished 6th at the 2017 European 10,000m Cup and competed at the 2011 IAAF World Cross Country Championships (senior race).

Personal best
10,000 m: 28:37.29 ( Fucecchio, 9 Aprile 2016)

Achievements

National titles
Italian Athletics Championships
10,000 metres: 2016, 2017
Half marathon: 2018

References

External links
 

1990 births
Living people
People from Fès-Meknès
Moroccan emigrants to Italy
Italian sportspeople of African descent
Italian male cross country runners
Italian male long-distance runners
Athletics competitors of Fiamme Gialle
Naturalised citizens of Italy